Rafael Luiz Baüml Tesser (born 16 May 1981), better known as Tesser, is a Brazilian footballer who plays as defender.

Career
He began his professional career playing with Tarmandaré in 2000. From 2001 to 2004, he was at Coritiba at Série A. In January 2005, he signed a one-year contract with Atlético Mineiro at Série A. He then played for Joinville and Ituano at Série B.

In January 2007 transfer window he joined Italian Serie B team U.S. Lecce . He then joined Taranto Sport. Tesser was on a tryout at Serbian Red Star Belgrade which was managed by his former coach at US Lecce, Zdenek Zeman, but he did not pass tryout at Serbian Red Star Belgrade. Then he was signed by Italian Lega Pro side Benevento.

In March 2009, he signed a contract until the end of season with Marcílio Dias at Série C.

In August 2009, he rejoined Joinville.

References

External links

aic.football.it
CBF 

Brazilian footballers
Brazilian expatriate footballers
Coritiba Foot Ball Club players
FC Dinamo Tbilisi players
Clube Atlético Mineiro players
Joinville Esporte Clube players
Ituano FC players
Grêmio Barueri Futebol players
Red Bull Brasil players
U.S. Lecce players
Taranto F.C. 1927 players
Benevento Calcio players
América Futebol Clube (SP) players
Serie B players
Expatriate footballers in Georgia (country)
Expatriate footballers in Italy
Association football defenders
Footballers from Curitiba
1981 births
Living people
Brazilian expatriate sportspeople in Georgia (country)
Brazilian people of German descent